
Year 485 BC was a year of the pre-Julian Roman calendar. At the time, it was known as the Year of the Consulship of Cornelius and Vibulanus (or, less frequently, year 269 Ab urbe condita). The denomination 485 BC for this year has been used since the early medieval period, when the Anno Domini calendar era became the prevalent method in Europe for naming years.

Events 
 By place 

 Persian Empire 
 Xerxes I is just beginning his reign after the death of his father Darius the Great in 486 BC. During this time the Persian empire extends as far west as Macedonia and Libya and as far east as the Hyphasis (Beas) River; it stretches to the Caucasus Mountains and the Aral Sea in the north and to the Persian Gulf and the Arabian Desert in the south.

 Sicily 
 Gelo, the tyrant of Gela, takes advantage of an appeal by the descendants of the first colonist of Syracuse, the Gamoroi, who had held power until they were expelled by the Killichiroi, the lower class of the city. He makes himself master of that city, leaving his brother Hieron to control Gela.

Roman Republic
 Three times Roman consul Spurius Cassius Vecellinus is tried, condemned and executed for high treason.
 The consul Quintus Fabius Vibulanus defeated the Volsci and Aequi in battle, but incurred the anger of the plebs by lodging the spoils of victory with the publicum.

Births 
Herodotus, Greek historian, is estimated to be born this year.
Some sources place the birth of Euripides in this year, though the more traditional date is 480.

Deaths 
 Spurius Cassius Vecellinus, three times Roman consul.

References